The 2014 Aragon Superbike World Championship round was the second round of the 2014 Superbike World Championship. It took place over the weekend of 11–13 April 2014 at the MotorLand Aragón near Alcañiz, Spain.

Superbike

Race 1 classification

Notes:
 — Bimota entries were not eligible to score points and were removed from the race results.

Race 2 classification

Notes:
 — Bimota entries were not eligible to score points and were removed from the race results.

Supersport

Race classification

References

External links
 The official website of the Superbike World Championship

Aragon
Aragon